The 2022 Hockey East Men's Ice Hockey Tournament was the 37th edition of the Hockey East Tournament. It was played between March 9 and March 19, 2022. As the tournament champions, Massachusetts received the conference's automatic bid into the 2022 NCAA Division I Men's Ice Hockey Tournament.

Format
The tournament included all eleven teams in the conference. Teams were ranked according to their finish in the conference standings. Seeds 1–5 earned a bye into the quarterfinal round, while seeds 6–11 played to determine the remaining quarterfinalists. Winners in the opening round were reseeded and advanced to play top three seeds in reverse order. Winners of the quarterfinal matches were again reseeded for the semifinal, and the winners of those two games faced off in the championship.

All series were single-elimination with opening round and quarterfinal matches occurring at home team sites. Beginning with the semifinal round, all games were held at the TD Garden. The tournament champion received an automatic bid into the 2022 NCAA Division I Men's Ice Hockey Tournament

Standings

Bracket
Teams are reseeded after the Opening Round and Quarterfinals

Note: * denotes overtime period(s)

Results

Opening Round

(6) Merrimack vs. (11) Maine

(7) Providence vs. (10) Vermont

(8) Boston College vs. (9) New Hampshire

Quarterfinals

(1) Northeastern vs. (8) Boston College

(2) Massachusetts vs. (7) Providence

(3) Massachusetts Lowell vs. (6) Merrimack

(4) Connecticut vs. (5) Boston University

Semifinals

(1) Northeastern vs. (4) Connecticut

(2) Massachusetts vs. (3) Massachusetts Lowell

Championship

(2) Massachusetts vs. (4) Connecticut

Tournament Awards

All-Tournament Team
Goaltender – Matt Murray, Massachusetts
Defenceman – John Spetz, Connecticut
Defenceman – Colin Felix, Massachusetts
Forward – Vladislav Firstov, Connecticut
Forward – Garrett Wait, Massachusetts
Forward – Bobby Trivigno, Massachusetts

Tournament MVP
Bobby Trivigno, Massachusetts

References

External links
2022 Hockey East Men's Ice Hockey Tournament

Hockey East Men's Ice Hockey Tournament
Hockey East Men's Ice Hockey Tournament
College sports in Massachusetts
Ice hockey in Boston
Hockey East Men's Ice Hockey Tournament
Hockey East Men's Ice Hockey Tournament
Hockey East Men's Ice Hockey Tournament